Gary Thompson may refer to:

 Gary Thompson (basketball coach) (c. 1932 – 2010), American college basketball coach, head basketball coach at Wichita State University from 1964 to 1971
 Gary Thompson (basketball player), All-American basketball player at Iowa State
 Gary Thompson (racing driver) (born 1992), Irish racecar driver
 Gary Thompson (soccer) (born 1945), Canadian international and North American Soccer League player
 Gary Scott Thompson (born 1959), American TV producer

See also
 Garry Thompson (disambiguation)
 Garry Thomson (1925–2007), conservator and a Buddhist
 Gary Thomson, rugby league player